Gordon Bennett may refer to:

People
 Gordon Bennett (artist) (1955–2014), Australian artist
 Gordon Bennett (football) (died 2020), English football manager
 Gordon Bennett (general) (1887–1962), Australian soldier
 Gordon Bennett (union organiser) (1944–1991), Christmas Island labor advocate
 Gordon Dunlap Bennett (born 1946), American Catholic bishop
 Gordon Lockhart Bennett (1912–2000), Canadian politician
 James Gordon Bennett Sr. (1795–1872), American editor and New York Herald founder
 James Gordon Bennett Jr. (1841–1918), his son, American publisher and sportsman

Other uses
 Gordon Bennett (comics), a British comic book character
 Gordon Bennett (phrase), an English idiomatic phrase, after James Gordon Bennett Jr.
 "Gordon Bennett", a song by Gilbert O'Sullivan from the 1989 album In the Key of G

See also
 Gordon Bennett Cup (disambiguation)
 Gordon Bennetts (1909–1987), Australian cricketer